Maiken Baird is an American documentary film director and producer.

Baird (along with co-director Michelle Major) directed the documentary film Venus and Serena and produced Client 9: The Rise and Fall of Eliot Spitzer.

Early life and career 
Baird attended the Spence School and graduated in 1985. She later obtained a Bachelor of Arts degree in Political Science from Columbia University in 1989 and a Master's Degree in International Relations and Political Science from Stanford University in 1992.

Before her film career began, Baird worked at the United Nations, the European Union and the Royal Institute of International Affairs. Baird's first position working on documentary films was as a researcher at ABC News under Peter Jennings, where she first worked with her future co-director Michelle Majors. Baird later produced television documentaries for a variety of sources including New York Times Television, National Geographic Channel, A&E and MTV.

Directing career 
Baird met and became friends with Michelle Major while working together for ABC News. The pair became interested in directing a documentary about the Williams sisters in 2007 and began pitching the project. After what Baird says were "countless meetings and hundreds of emails" the sisters allowed Baird and Major access to film them throughout 2011. The pair went on to film over 400 hours of footage over the course of the year. In 2013 Baird and Major became the target of a lawsuit by the United States Tennis Association over their use of unauthorized footage in the film. While Baird and Majors initially sought and received an invitation from the USTA to film at the 2011 US Open, the organization later claimed the pair had violated a five-minute limit to the use of licensed footage and presented a view of professional tennis which was "not in the best interest of the sport."

Baird and Major attributed the lawsuit to their use of footage of Serena Williams' 2009 outburst at the US Open. The filmmakers believed the USTA worried the footage would cast the organisation in a bad light. In a letter co-written with Major, Baird appealed to the tennis community for support in challenging what she called an "attempt to censor filmmakers" by the USTA. Baird and Major reached a confidential settlement with the organization in 2013 which allowed Venus and Serena to be released unedited.

Producing career 
In addition to her own works, Baird has produced documentaries created by other directors. In 2017 she executive produced the feature No Stone Unturned, which investigates the story of the 1994 Loughinisland massacrein Northern Ireland. She also executive produced Elián, which focuses on Elián Gonzales as a grown adult and the story that followed his removal from the US to Cuba. Additionally, she executive produced the documentary City of Ghosts, which tells the story of ISIS fighters in the city of Raqqa during the fall of the attempted caliphate. 
Baird was the executive producer of Icarus, which follows the story of Bryan Fogel as he investigates the world of doping and the ability for athletes to hide their use of pharmacological support. The film received the Academy Award for Best Documentary Feature in 2018. In 2018 Baird also produced the film Cradle of Champions, which follows the 2015 New York State Golden Gloves and its competitors within the context of post-industrial urban America. In 2018 Baird was an executive producer for the documentary film Divide and Conquer: The Story of Roger Ailes, and in 2019 she was an executive producer for the documentary film Mystify: Michael Hutchence.

Personal life 
Baird lives in New York City with her husband and three children Brita, Euan, and Maia. She is trilingual, speaking Danish, French, and English.

See also 
List of female film and television directors

References

External links 
 

Living people
American documentary film directors
American documentary film producers
Columbia College (New York) alumni
Stanford University School of Humanities and Sciences alumni
Year of birth missing (living people)
Spence School alumni